Trihamus is an ichnogenus of (probably bipedal) dinosaur footprint.

See also

 List of dinosaur ichnogenera

References

Dinosaur trace fossils